MusicFest Aberystwyth is a fusion of international Music festival and Summer school held in Aberystwyth, Ceredigion, Wales. Founded in 1987 by the cellist Nicholas Jones, MusicFest initially started as a small series of concerts. In 1988 a small Summer School was run alongside the concerts which provided chamber music coaching for pianists and string players. MusicFest has since evolved into an international Festival and Summer School.

Throughout the Festival there are daily evening and lunchtime festival concerts, together with student foyer performances and student showcase concerts. The 2009 festival features guest artists and visiting tutors include Orion Orchestra, cellist Guy Johnston, pianist Tom Poster, the National Youth Jazz Wales, Solstice Quartet, Sacconi Quartet.

Summer School

The Summer School offers young and up and coming music students an opportunity to study with leading professionals. A team of internationally renowned musicians and tutors, led by Artistic Director David Campbell, offers organised, structured chamber music opportunities. Throughout the week the artists in residence coach ensembles, lead workshops, and give master-classes as well as performing in the Festival concerts. Based on the ethos of 'learning through listening, practice & performance', courses are run for string chamber music, solo strings, clarinet, wind chamber music, conducting, composition, saxophone, jazz, voice, and harp. Students also have the opportunity to perform in public.

Courses

Courses run included clarinet, run by David Campbell, saxophone, Jazz/Latin, string, brass, voice, composition, wind octet, flute and practical psychology.

Artists-in-residence 
 
Tom Poster - Piano 
Guy Johnston - Cello 
Simon Lane - Piano 
Juliet Edwards - Piano 
John Flinders - Piano 
Orion Orchestra
National Youth Choir of Wales
Solstice Quartet
Eleanor Turner - Harp
Laurence Perkins - Bassoon
Sigyn Fosness - Violin
Nicholas Jones - Cello
Gerard McChrystal - Saxophone
Lucinda Mackworth-Young - Practical Psychology
John Metcalf - Composition
Toby Purser - Conducting
Veronica Veysey-Campbell - Voice

Performance Venues

Aberystwyth Arts Centre
Joseph Parry Hall
Llanbadarn Church
Ceredigion Museum
The Bandstand

Friends of MusicFest

Friends of MusicFest is a charitable organisation which exists to support individual students attending MusicFest who may not otherwise be able to afford to do so.

References

External links 
Festival website
Aberystwyth Arts Centre

Cultural festivals in the United Kingdom
Festivals in Wales
Aberystwyth